Crypt of the Shadowking is a fantasy novel by Mark Anthony, set in the world of the Forgotten Realms, and based on the Dungeons & Dragons role-playing game. It is the sixth novel in "The Harpers" series. It was published in paperback in March 1993.

Plot summary
Harper agents try to stop the Zhentarim as they attempt to take over a city.

Reception
Hugh M. Flick, Jr. of Kliatt magazine said Crypt of the Shadowking was "well written."

References

1993 American novels
Forgotten Realms novels